"All I Do Is Love Her" is a song recorded by American country music artist James Bonamy. It was released in October 1996 as the fourth single from the album What I Live to Do. The song reached No. 27 on the Billboard Hot Country Singles & Tracks chart.  The song was written by Skip Ewing and Wayland Patton.

Chart performance

References

1996 singles
1996 songs
James Bonamy songs
Songs written by Skip Ewing
Songs written by Wayland Patton
Song recordings produced by Doug Johnson (record producer)
Epic Records singles